David Bentz is an American politician. He is a Democratic member of the Delaware House of Representatives, representing district 18. Bentz won a special election on September 12, 2015, to replace Democrat Michael Barbieri, who had resigned the month before to take a job with the state government.

References

External links
Official page at the Delaware General Assembly
Campaign site
 

Living people
Pennsylvania State University alumni
University of Delaware alumni
Democratic Party members of the Delaware House of Representatives
21st-century American politicians
1986 births